The Bangladesh Coast Guard (BCG) is the maritime law enforcement force of Bangladesh. It is a paramilitary force which is under the jurisdiction of the Ministry of Home Affairs. Its officers and sailors are transferred from Bangladesh Navy, and most of the medical officers are transferred from Bangladesh Army. The Bangladesh Coast Guard also performs the duty of maritime border security of Bangladesh. The headquarters is located in Dhaka, Bangladesh. Currently the coast guard has 3,339 personnel and 63 ships. A modernisation plan named Coast Guard Goal 2030 has been undertaken to enhance its capabilities.

History 
The Bangladesh Navy had been performing the duties of a Coast Guard in addition to its own duties of maritime defense since 1994. As time passed, the growing responsibility and workload became inconvenient for the Bangladesh Navy, with the increasing volume of policing duties at sea taking away from its primary role. The emergence of the Bangladesh Coast Guard was the result of the growing awareness in the Government for the requirement of a separate service to enforce national laws in the waters under national jurisdiction and ensure safety of life and property at sea. Following this the Coast Guard Act 1994 was passed by the Parliament in September 1994.
Formally the Bangladesh Coast Guard in its present shape came into being on 14 February 1995 and started operational activities with two patrol craft received from Bangladesh Navy. The force is under the jurisdiction of the Ministry of Home Affairs.

The Bangladesh Coast Guard motto is 'Guardian at Sea'.

The Bangladesh Coast Guard is a unique force that carries out an array of civil and military responsibilities touching almost every facet of the Bangladesh maritime environment. The Headquarters of Bangladesh Coast Guard in Agargaon, Sher-e-Bangla Nagar, Dhaka-1207 and four Zones (Dhaka, Chittagong, Mongla

and Bhola.

Role and mission 

Over 90% of Bangladesh exports and imports pass through two seaports at Chittagong and Mongla. Sea-lines communication to these two seaports are the lifelines of the Bangladesh economy. UNCLOS 1982 has made provision for sovereign rights for exploration and exploitation of living and non-living resources in the Bangladesh EEZ. The fishery sector contributes an important part of national export earnings. A significant quantity of gas has been discovered at Sangu in the Bay of Bengal, the extraction of which has already started. Apart from these, a vast number of ships and craft of various types and sizes operate at sea for trade, commerce, fishing, research, exploration and extraction of oil, gas and minerals and so on. To exercise effective control, to ensure safety and security and protect national and international maritime interest at sea, all these diverse activities are brought under various national and international laws and acts.

Mission 
Control piracy, illegal trafficking, protect the fishery, oil, gas, forest resources and environmental pollution in Bangladesh waters and coastal areas, ensure overall security and law and order through security assistance to seaports, conduct relief and rescue operation in the coastal areas during natural calamity.

Role

Primary
 Preserve national interest at sea
 Fishery protection
 Prevent illegal immigration through the sea
 Pollution control
 Piracy control
 Prevent smuggling, trafficking of illegal arms, drugs and narcotics
 Disaster relief operations
 Search and rescue operations
 Preservation of forest
 Surveillance over the sea areas of Bangladesh
 Carry out any other duty assigned by the government

Secondary
 Assist Bangladesh Navy during war

Area of jurisdiction
The area of jurisdiction of the Bangladesh Coast Guard is the sea territory of Bangladesh as declared under the Territorial and Maritime Zone Act, 1974. The Bangladesh Government being a signatory has ratified UNCLOS, 1982.

Areas of Jurisdiction in the Bay of Bengal are:
 Internal Waters
 Territorial Water
 Contiguous Zone
 Exclusive Economic Zone
 Continental Shelf

Apart from the sea territory of Bangladesh, the government has also placed the waterways of the mangrove forest of Sundarban and major rivers up to Dhaka under the jurisdiction of the Coast Guard.

The Bangladesh Coast Guard has the following zonal command: Dhaka, East, West and South zones .

Command and control

Headquarters

Zonal commands

Training Base BCG Agrajatra

Rank structure
Commissioned officers

Other ranks

Medals 

 Bangladesh Coast Guard Padak (Bravery)
 President Coast Guard Padak (Bravery)
 Bangladesh Coast Guard Padak (Service)
 President Coast Guard Padak (Service)

List of Director Generals

Ships

Future modernisation plan
The Bangladesh government has started a massive modernization plan named Coast Guard Goal 2030 to make Coast Guard a well-trained and well-equipped force to ensure the security of the coastal area. The expansion of the force manpower is also included in the plan.

Dockyard and Engineering Works Limited is constructing two inshore patrol vessels (IPV) for the Bangladesh Coast Guard. These vessels will be 52.8 meters long, 7.4 meters wide and have a draught of 4.5 meters with a displacement of 315 tonnes.

Coast guard ordered six X12 high-speed boats which are being built at Dockyard and Engineering Works Limited with technical assistance from Indonesia.

In October 2021, Bangladesh Coast Guard has ordered undisclosed number of Turkish-made ARES 150 HERCULES Offshore Patrol Vessels.

The formation of Coast Guard aviation wing is under process. The force has a plan to procure 10 helicopters for patrolling and search and rescue (SAR) operations within 2025.

Coast guard also wants to be a technologically advanced outfit in monitoring the sea. It has a long-term plan of installing Long-range identification and tracking (LRIT) and Vessel Traffic Management Information System (VTMIS) systems by 2025.

References

External links 
 Bangladesh Coast Guard Website

 
1995 establishments in Bangladesh
Coast guards
Law enforcement in Bangladesh
Paramilitary forces of Bangladesh
Government agencies of Bangladesh
Uniformed services of Bangladesh